"Back to the Primitive" is a heavy metal song by Soulfly, released in 2000. The song, composed by Max Cavalera, is played as the first track of the second Soulfly album, Primitive.

Music and lyrics 
The song features simple downtuned riffs, plus tribal drumming and blabbering; it also plays berimbau to begin the song. Lyrically, this political song is about demoting national government back to local tribal society. Every choruses begin with 'Back to the Primitive', except for the first line of lyric  ("one, two, three, four" in Portuguese) to begin the song, and verses containing just "primitive" per line.

Music video 
The song begins with a berimbau, but it is not the case for the accompanying music video. Instead, the intro plays tribal percussion with 'Soulfly' chants alternately by Cavalera and spectators; the berimbau is shown, but not heard. The drumming intro lasts 29 seconds, compared to just 23 seconds for the berimbau intro. Interspersed in the video are religious imagery and people of different cultures while the band performs the song in front of an audience. At the end of the video, Ozzy Osbourne makes a cameo by saying "Primitive!" into the camera.

Track listing 

 include music video "Back to the Primitive"

Personnel

Soulfly
Max Cavalera – vocals, rhythm guitar, berimbau
Mikey Doling – lead guitar
Marcello D. Rapp – bass, percussion
Joe Nunez – drums

Additional personnel
Tom Araya – vocals on "Terrorist"
Max Cavalera – production
Toby Wright – production
Andy Wallace – mixing
The Rootsman – remixing

Charts

References 

Soulfly songs
2000 singles
2000 songs
Political songs
Roadrunner Records singles
Songs written by Max Cavalera